William Naismith Blyth (17 June 1895 – 1 July 1968), generally known as Billy Blyth, was a Scottish footballer.

Born in Dalkeith, Midlothian, Blyth played as a schoolboy for local junior side Wemyss Athletic. He was briefly on the books of Manchester City before signing for Arsenal in May 1914. He quickly made his debut for the Gunners, in a Second Division against Huddersfield Town on 21 November 1914, a game that Arsenal lost 3–0. Blyth made 12 appearances in 1914–15 but by then the First World War had broken out, and Blyth duly joined the Royal Army Service Corps, serving in France.

Upon the end of hostilities and the resumption of football in 1919, Blyth returned to Arsenal and immediately became a regular in the newly promoted side. An energetic "midfield dynamo", Blyth usually figured on the left of midfield, as a left half or inside left. He became a mainstay in the side, with over 300 league games in 10 seasons, and became club captain in 1925. He also played in the 1927 FA Cup Final, Arsenal's first cup final, which they lost 1–0 to Cardiff City. In total, he played 343 matches for Arsenal, scoring 51 goals.

He moved to Birmingham in May 1929, playing his last first-team game in September 1930 before retiring at the end of the 1930–31 season. Blyth also starred in one of the first football-related films, the 1930 production The Great Game. After retiring, Blyth moved back to Scotland, and ran a pub in Port Seton. He died in Worthing, West Sussex, England, in 1968 at the age of 73.

Honours

Player
Arsenal
FA Cup runner-up: 1926–27

References

1895 births
1968 deaths
People from Dalkeith
Scottish footballers
Association football midfielders
Manchester City F.C. players
Arsenal F.C. players
Birmingham City F.C. players
English Football League players
Sportspeople from Midlothian
British Army personnel of World War I
Royal Army Service Corps soldiers
20th-century English male actors
English male film actors
FA Cup Final players